Andrew Dryburgh Provand (23 March 1838 – 18 July 1915) was a Scottish merchant strongly linked to Manchester; he was also a Liberal Party politician who served as the Member of Parliament (MP) for Glasgow Blackfriars and Hutchesontown from 1886 to 1900.

Background
Provand was the son of George Provand, a Glasgow merchant and his wife Ann Reid Dryburgh. He never married.

Career
He won the seat in 1886, but lost it fourteen years later at the 1900 general election to future Prime Minister, Bonar Law. He unsuccessfully contested the same seat again in 1906. During his time in Parliament, he was involved in debates over land taxation.

He died on 18 July 1915 and is buried in the graveyard at the Ramshorn Church (now known as Ramshorn Cemetery on Ingram Street in Glasgow. The grave lies on the eastern boundary wall.

References

External links 
article
 

1839 births
1915 deaths
Members of the Parliament of the United Kingdom for Glasgow constituencies
Scottish Liberal Party MPs
UK MPs 1886–1892
UK MPs 1892–1895
UK MPs 1895–1900